Timerbayevo (Timerbay) is a rural locality (a village) in Svobodinsky Selsoviet, Kuyurgazinsky District, Bashkortostan, Russia. The population was 298 as of 2010. There are 3 streets.

Geography 
Timerbayevo is located 45 km west of Yermolayevo (the district's administrative centre) by road. Kinya-Abyz is the nearest rural locality.

References 

Rural localities in Kuyurgazinsky District